Edward Adam Sauer  (November 27, 1898 - February 1980)  was a professional football player who played during the early years of the National Football League. A resident of Van Buren Township, Ohio, Sauer attended and played football for nearby Miami University. He made his NFL debut in 1920 with the Dayton Triangles. Sauer also played for the Pottsville Maroons and won the 1925 NFL Championship with the team before the title was stripped from the team due to a disputed rules violation. he also played with the Akron Pros and the Canton Bulldogs of the early league.

1898 births
Players of American football from Ohio
Akron Pros players
Canton Bulldogs players
Dayton Triangles players
Pottsville Maroons players
Miami RedHawks football players
1980 deaths
People from Darke County, Ohio
American football offensive linemen